Affranchi is a former French legal term denoting a freedman or emancipated slave, but was a term used to refer pejoratively to mulattoes. It is used in the English language to describe the social class of freedmen in Saint-Domingue, and other slave-holding French territories, who held legal rights intermediate between those of free whites and enslaved Africans. In Saint-Domingue, roughly half of the affranchis were gens de couleur libres (free people of color; Mulatto) and the other half African slaves.

The term is derived from the French word for emancipation — affranchissement, or enfranchisement in terms of political rights. But, the affranchis were barred from the franchise (voting) prior to a 1791 court case, which followed the French Revolution. The decision in their favor prompted a backlash from the French white planter class on Saint-Domingue, who also exerted power in France. These elements contributed to the outbreak of the Haitian Revolution.

The affranchis had legal and social advantages over enslaved Africans. They became a distinct class in the society between whites and slaves.  They could get some education, were able to own land, and could attend some French colonial entertainments. Planters who took slave women or free women of color as concubines, often sent their sons to France for education. In some cases these sons entered the French military. The parents were more likely to settle property on them as well. Because of such property and class issues, some free men of color considered themselves to have status above that of the petits blancs, shopkeepers and workers. Nonetheless, the latter had more political rights in the colony until after the Revolution.

The colonists passed so many restrictions that the affranchis were limited as a separate caste: they could not vote or hold colonial administrative posts, or work in professional careers as doctors or lawyers. There were sumptuary laws: the free people of color were forbidden to wear the style of clothes favored by the wealthy white colonists. In spite of the disadvantages, many educated affranchis identified culturally with France rather than with the enslaved population.  A social class in between, the free people of color sometimes had tensions with both whites and enslaved Africans.

Ambitious mulattoes worked to gain acceptance from the white colonists who held power in that society. As they advanced in society, affranchis often also held land and slaves. Some acted as creditors for planters.  One of their leaders in the late 18th century, Julien Raimond, an indigo planter, claimed that affranchis owned a third of all the slaves in the colony at that time.  In the early years of the French Revolution and Haitian Revolution, many gens de couleur were committed to maintaining the institution of slavery. They wanted political equality based on class - that is, extended for men of property, regardless of skin color.

See also
 Gens de couleur
 Emancipados
 Mulatto Haitian
 Assimilation (French colonialism)

References

External links
 African Americans in New Orleans: 'Les gens de couleur libres' (Free people of color), Online Exhibits, New Orleans Public Library, 1999

Ethnic groups in Guadeloupe
Ethnic groups in Haiti
Ethnic groups in Martinique
Freedmen
French legal terminology
Haitian people of Mulatto descent
History of Guadeloupe
History of Haiti
History of Martinique
Mulatto
Anti-African and anti-black slurs
People of Saint-Domingue
Person of color
Slavery in Guadeloupe
Slavery in Haiti
Slavery in Martinique
Slavery in the United States
Social class in France